Karel Kolský (21 September 1914 in Kročehlavy – 17 February 1984) was a Czech football player and later a football manager. He played for Czechoslovakia, for which he played 13 matches.

He was a participant in the 1938 FIFA World Cup, and he coached Czechoslovakia at the 1958 FIFA World Cup.

After World War II, he worked as a football manager. He coached clubs such as Sparta Prague, SK Kladno, Dukla Prague, Viktoria Plzeň, Zbrojovka Brno and Polish Wisła Kraków.

He won twice the Czechoslovak First League with Dukla Prague, in 1956 and 1958.

External links
 Profile at ČMFS website
 Profile at Hall of Fame Dukla Praha
 

1914 births
1984 deaths
Czech footballers
Czechoslovak footballers
Czech football managers
Czech expatriate football managers
Czechoslovak football managers
1938 FIFA World Cup players
1958 FIFA World Cup managers
Czechoslovakia international footballers
AC Sparta Prague players
SK Kladno players
Czechoslovakia national football team managers
FC Zbrojovka Brno managers
Dukla Prague managers
FC Viktoria Plzeň managers
AC Sparta Prague managers
FK Hvězda Cheb managers
Wisła Kraków managers
Expatriate football managers in Poland
Czechoslovak expatriate sportspeople in Poland
Association football midfielders
Sportspeople from Kladno
FK Jablonec managers
People from the Kingdom of Bohemia